Ikuinen virta is the first album by Finnish pop rock band Indica, released in 2004. It spent a total of 29 weeks in the Finnish Top 40, peaking at number 4 in January 2005.

Track list
Saalistaja (Predator) - 3:29 
Scarlett - 3:29 
Ikuinen virta (The Eternal Stream) - 4:15 
Valehtelen (I Lie) - 4:07
Surusilmä (One with Sad Eyes) - 4:43 
Lasienkeli (Glass Angel) - 2:58
Onnen kartano (Mansion of Joy) - 4:04
Ihmisen lento (The Flight of Man) - 3:31
Lauluja paratiisista (Songs from Paradise) - 3:10
Aaltojen takaa (From Behind the Waves) - 4:19
Vettä vasten (Against the Water) - 6:08 
Unten maa (Land of Dreams) - 4:02 *
Odotan (I Wait) - 4:21 *

Links to online bonus tracks "Odotan" and "Unten maa" *

Video clips
Scarlett
Ikuinen virta

References

2004 debut albums
Indica (band) albums